Jacob Rauluni (born 25 June 1972) is a former International Rugby Union player who comes from a family of international halfbacks. His father, Taito, played halfback for Fiji, as did his brother Mosese and his first cousin Waisale Serevi, who also started his career at halfback. Rauluni played for the Queensland Reds from 1995 to 2002 and he played for Fiji from 1995 to 2006. He had an extended spell playing rugby in the UK, and is best known for helping Rotherham Titans win promotion to the Premiership. In 2006 he played three tests for The Barbarians. He retired from international rugby in 2007, having played 52 tests. He played his last test against Japan as Captain of the Fiji national team.

Test career
Rauluni has been capped 52 times by his country including Captaining them in the 2003 season. He has played in three World Cups in 1995, 1999 and 2003.

Rauluni had a very good combination with Fijian first five eighth Nicky Little throughout his career.

Rauluni's first test was against South Africa and he played his first Telecom Fiji Cup game in July 2000, turning out alongside Marika Vunibaka to help Suva defeat Tailevu.

Club career
Rauluni grew up in Brisbane and played for Easts Rugby Union from the age of eight. He played for Australian Schoolboys and Australian Under 19s and Under 21s before choosing to play for Fiji. At school he used to play flanker, but the Aussie Schoolboys team needed a halfback for the tour of the UK in 1991, and Rauluni says he was handed the No. 9 jersey because of his family's tradition.

Rauluni played for Queensland from 1995 to 2002 and played over 55 Super 12 games. He was part of 2000 and 2002 semifinals. Rauluni chose to play for Fiji like his father Taito.

Rauluni kept the starting spot in the Fiji team for over a decade, and also played for the Queensland Reds in Super 12 from 1995 to 2002, playing in the semi-finals in 2000 and 2002. Leeds Tykes signed Rauluni on a one-year contract from Guinness Premiership side Bristol ahead of the 2006–07 season. An experienced scrum half at the time, Rauluni played a role in helping the club achieve promotion. He made his debut in the third game of the season, away against Pertemps Bees. He spent three successful seasons playing for Rotherham, making 51 appearances for Rotherham between 2002 and 2005. He was a key member of the promotion winning side and featured in their Premiership campaign in 2003-04.

Rauluni played rugby for the Capella Cattledogs and in 2009 played for Queensland Country. He debuted for the Capricorn Coast Crocs in 2014. Jacob was instrumental in the early success of the crocs in the Rockhampton and districts A grade competition. Jacob unfortunately succumbed to an injury which ended his session. He now plays for the Cap Coast Crocs Rugby Club and coaches Junior Rugby.

Personal life
Rauluni married Vanessa in 1998 and settled in Central Queensland where they have four sons.

References

External links
 teivov profile 
 Leeds profile
 Scrum Profile

1972 births
Fijian rugby union players
Leeds Tykes players
Living people
Rotherham Titans players
Queensland Reds players
Fijian expatriate rugby union players
Expatriate rugby union players in England
Fijian emigrants to Australia
People educated at Brisbane State High School
Sportspeople from Suva
I-Taukei Fijian people
Rugby union players from Brisbane
Fiji international rugby union players
Rugby union scrum-halves
Fijian expatriate sportspeople in England
Australian rugby union players
Australian expatriate rugby union players
Australian expatriate sportspeople in England